Lee Strafford is an English businessman, the former chairman of Sheffield Wednesday F.C., the Football club based in Sheffield, South Yorkshire. Strafford is also co-founder of NetStart. He was also co-founder and CEO of the UK ISP PlusNet.

Strafford became chairman of Sheffield Wednesday in 2009 and quickly made significant changes to the club including signing a charitable sponsorship deal with Sheffield Children's Hospital. However, it was announced in May 2010 that Strafford had resigned, having failed to ensure that the club stayed in the Football League Championship caused by apparent major disruption within the boardroom. Following his resignation Strafford engaged in a corporate whistle-blowing process, exposing various issues which directly contributed to the club's plight, a plight which almost resulted in the club being placed into administration. The club was bought by Milan Mandaric on 14 December 2010. Mandaric's bid was supported by the club's bankers and major creditor,  the Co-Operative Bank, in favour of an alternative bid by members of the incumbent board.

Strafford made his name with Sheffield-based Internet provider PlusNet. He took PlusNet from 7 to 200+ employees and from £0 to £100 million market cap, with the company eventually being sold to British Telecom for £67 million. During his time as CEO, the business went through three sale processes, 6 years as a reporting segment of Insight Enterprises Inc, a (NASDAQ listed Fortune 500 business), one AIM IPO, two and a half years as a plc and was eventually sold to BT Group in January 2007. Two months after acquiring Plusnet, BT sacked Strafford.

Strafford has spent much of the time since the sale of PlusNet working with Sheffield City Council and the two Sheffield Universities with a view to helping to create more technology start-ups in the region and establishing better support for existing technology businesses.

In December 2010 Strafford became a founding private sector board member of the Sheffield City Region Local Enterprise Partnership (http://www.sheffieldcityregion.org.uk/), working with a specific focus on the Creative and Digital industries agenda for the city region, while also working with the rest of the board on driving economic growth as a whole in the city region.

In June 2012 Strafford co-founded Dotforge, a pre-Seed Tech accelerator. Dotforge supports digital start-ups drawn from around the world and supports them through its programmes which are run primarily in Sheffield.

In November 2016 Strafford launched Accelerated Digital (ADV) Ventures http://accelerated.ventures . ADV is a venture investment company investing in and supporting startups & scaleups in the Tech (Digital) sector. Its initial geographic focus is on UK based companies. Strafford was a co-founder and the CEO.

References 

20th-century births
Living people
Sheffield Wednesday F.C. directors and chairmen
Year of birth missing (living people)